Svante Thuresson (7 February 1937 – 10 May 2021) was a Swedish jazz musician. He started his career as a drummer before joining the band Gals and Pals in 1963. Svante won the national selection and represented Sweden in the Eurovision song contest in 1966 with Nygammal vals ("New, Old-Fashioned Waltz") and came in second place; he performed with Lill Lindfors. 

In 2007, Thuresson and Anne-Lie Rydé performed at Melodifestivalen 2007 as a duo in hopes of represent Sweden in the Eurovision, but failed to make it to the final.

He died from a long-term illness on 10 May 2021, at the age of 84.

Discography
1967 – Doktor Dolittle with Siw Malmkvist, Per Myrberg and Fred Åkerström
1968 – Du ser en man 
1969 – Nyanser 
1970 – Noaks ark
1970 – Albin och Greta with Lill Lindfors
1972 – Danspartaj 1
1975 – Den första valsen 
1978 – Discohits 
1979 – Den är till dej 
1982 – Just in time with Hector Bingert
1986 – Pelle Svanslös
1993 – Live 
1993 – En salig man 
1995 – Jag är hip, baby
1998 – Vi som älskar och slåss 
2000 – Guldkorn (Samling) 
2002 – Nya kickar
2004 – Svante Thuressons bästa 
2005 – Box of pearls with Katrine Madsen
2007 – Svante Thuresson & Vänner
2011 – Regionala Nyheter: Stockholmsdelen
2011 – En cool jul

Singles and EPs for the Metronome label (1966–73)
1966 – Nygammal vals (med Ulla Hallin)– Hej systrar, hej bröder 
1966 – Jag har nära nog nästan allt – Mulliga Maj
1966 – Hej systrar hej bröder – Nygammal vals (With Ulla Hallin) – Mulliga Maj – Jag har nära nog nästan allt 
1967 – Fem minuter till – Nära mej 
1967 – Den sista valsen – Vintervalsen 
1968 – Du vet så väl (att jag behöver dej) – Från och med nu 
1968 – Min Rockefeller – Var finns det ord (with Siw Malmkvist) 
1968 – Du är en vårvind i April – Det känns skönt – det känns bra 
1968 – Baby I need your lovin' – Just one word from you 
1968 – Leva mitt liv – Du ser en man 
1968 – Jag vill ha all din kärlek – Maria Marlene 
1969 – Under sol, under hav – Simma (Promo) 
1969 – Vackraste paret i världen – Jag är kvinna, du är man with Siw Malmkvist
1969 – Sommarflicka – Under sol, över hav 
1969 – Jag tror att jag är kär i dej, Maria – Det svänger om det mesta 
1970 – Nyanser – Kärlekens fjäril 
1970 – Noaks ark – Vill hellre ha en sommar 
1970 – Håll mig nära – Ingen gör någonting 
1970 – När jag putsar fönster – Det svänger så skönt om barockens musik 
1971 – En sommardag – Vem kan svara på min fråga (Promo) 
1971 – Soldater som vill va' hjältar – Jag ska vara hos dej i kväll 
1973 – Vår egen gata  – Dröm ur dina drömmars glas

Filmography
 1961 – Åsa–Nisse bland grevar och baroner
 1986 – Bambi (Swedish voice)
 1993–1995 – De vilda djurens flykt (Swedish voice)
 1994 – The Lion King (Swedish voice of Rafiki)
 2005 – Robots (Swedish voice)

References

External links

Article on esctoday.com
Info on cafecreme.nu
 

1937 births
2021 deaths
20th-century drummers
20th-century Swedish male singers
Eurovision Song Contest entrants of 1966
Melodifestivalen winners
Singers from Stockholm
Eurovision Song Contest entrants for Sweden
Melodifestivalen contestants of 2007
Melodifestivalen contestants of 2006